Hisami Kuroiwa is a Japanese-American film producer.

Career
Born in Japan, Hisami was educated at Meiji Gakuin University in Tokyo before moving to the United States to pursue her career. She based herself in New York City, where she has now been working in the film industry for over 25 years.

Her first big success came with Smoke in 1995, starring Harvey Keitel and Forest Whitaker. The film won the Silver Bear at the Berlin International Film Festival and introduced director Wayne Wang to the world.

In 1997 she produced Sunday, which starred Jared Harris in his first major role, and went on to take $6 million at the box office despite having a very low budget.

Also in 1997 came the cult success of Bent starring Clive Owen, adapted from the play by Martin Sherman. It won the Award of the Youth at the Cannes Film Festival.

Uncredited, Hisami has provided financing and production support for a host of other well-known directors, including Wong Kar-wai, Jim Jarmusch and Gaspar Noe. Known for widespread connections in Asia (particularly Japan and Hong Kong), Europe and North America, Hisami has been instrumental in the launching of many careers, whilst simultaneously being a major patron of the photographic arts in Japan and the USA.

She has also developed one of K-Michel Parandi's first screenplay, Nature of April.

In addition to her work in the film world, she is on the board of advisors for Kaya, a literary publisher.

Filmography
When Pigs Fly
Blue in the Face
Smoke
Flirt
Sunday
Bent
Kool: Dancing in my Mind
A History of Sex
Love God
Miss Wonton
1937

External links

 Kaya

Japanese film producers
Japanese women film producers
Year of birth missing (living people)
Living people
Japanese emigrants to the United States
Meiji Gakuin University alumni